Amazon's Best Books of the Year is a list of best books created yearly by Amazon.com.  It is a list of best books picked by Amazon editors and customers. It began in 2000.  Customer favorites are ranked according to the number of sales made through October, for books published in that calendar year.  The lists are usually announced in early November. The list has garnered attention from media such as The Guardian, CBS News and others.

Best Books of the Year

2000

2001
Top 25 Editors' Picks.
Top 25 Customer Favorites.

2002
Top 50 Editors' Picks.
Top 50 Customer Favorites.

2003
Top 50 Editors' Picks.
Top 50 Customer Favorites.

2004
Top 50 Editors' Picks.
Top 50 Customer Favorites.

2005
Top 50 Editors' Picks.
Top 50 Customer Favorites.

2006
Top 50 Editors' Picks.
Top 50 Customer Favorites.

2007
Top 100 Editors' Picks.
Top 100 Customer Favorites.

2008
Top 100 Editors' Picks.
Top 100 Customer Favorites.

2009
Top 100 Editors' Picks.
Top 100 Customer Favorites.

2010
Top 100 Editors' Picks.
Top 100 Customer Favorites.

2011
Top 100 Editors' Picks.
Top 100 Customer Favorites.

2012
Top 100 Editors' Picks.

2013
Top 100 Editors' Picks.

2014
Top 100 Editors' Picks.

2015
Top 100 Editors' Picks.

2016
Top 100 Editors' Picks.

2017
Top 100 Editor's Picks.

2018

100 Books to Read in a Lifetime
Amazon editors released a list of 100 best books to read in a lifetime.

References

Amazon (company)
American literary awards
Awards established in 2000